List of Guggenheim Fellowships awarded in 1935. Forty-seven artists and scholars received fellowships.

1935 U.S. and Canadian Fellows

1935 Latin American and Caribbean Fellows

See also
 Guggenheim Fellowship
 List of Guggenheim Fellowships awarded in 1934
 List of Guggenheim Fellowships awarded in 1936

References

1935
1935 awards